Kadhim Nasser  (born 9 January 1960) is an Iraqi former football goalkeeper who played for Iraq at the 1977 FIFA World Youth Championship. 

Nasser played for the national team in 1979.

References

Iraqi footballers
Iraq international footballers
Living people
Association football goalkeepers
1960 births